This is a list of notable Egyptian Armenians who have contributed to modern Egypt.

Literature
 Arpiar Arpiarian, writer
 Vahan Malezian, writer
 Yervant Odian, writer
 Hovhannes Setian, writer
 Vahan Tekeyan, poet
 Perch Zeytuntsyan, writer

Arts
 Armen Agop, sculptor
 Yuhanna al-Armani, 18th century Coptic icon painter
 Anoushka, Armenian Egyptian singer
 Garbis Aprikian, musician
 Armand, photographer
 Atom Egoyan, Canadian filmmaker of Armenian Egyptian origin
 Feyrouz, Perouz Artin, child actress in the 1950s and 1960s
 Gohar Gasparyan, opera singer
 Georges Kazazian, musician / oudist (based in Egypt)
 Edmond Kiraz, cartoonist
 Lebleba, or Lubluba, real name Nonia Kupelian, Egyptian actress
 Nelly, Nelly Artin Kalfaian, actress, performer and entertainer
 Raffi, or Raffi Cavoukian, Canadian Egyptian children's singer and songwriter of Armenian origin
 Hagop Sandaldjian, musician and sculptor
 Alexander Saroukhan, cartoonist / caricaturist
 Arto Tchakmaktchian, sculptor and painter
 Ashot Zorian, Turkish-born Egyptian painter and educator of Armenian ethnicity

Community
 Zareh Nubar, president of the Armenian General Benevolent Union
 Armenak Yekarian, fedayee

Politics
 Boghos Nubar, son of Nubar Pasha, politician and co-founder of the Armenian General Benevolent Union
 Nubar Pasha, politician and the first Prime Minister of Egypt
 Boghos Yousefian, Minister of Commerce and Minister of Foreign Affairs
 Badr al-Jamali, vizier and prominent statesman for the Fatimid Caliphate under Caliph al-Mustansir

Religion
 Nerses Bedros XIX Tarmouni, Catholicos-Patriarch of the Armenian Catholic Church

Sciences
 Armenag K. Bedevian, botanist
 Aram Ter-Ghevondyan, historian
 Yervant Terzian, astronomer
 Joseph Hekekyan, archaeologist, surveyor and planner

Sport
 Rouben Vesmadian, professional basketball player

See also
Armenians in Egypt

References
 http://www.armembegypt.com/main.php?page=comhist
 http://www.egypttoday.com/article.aspx?ArticleID=6844

 
Lists of Armenian people
Armenian